Gangsta Rap is the eighth studio album by American rapper Ice-T. It was released on October 31, 2006 via Melee Entertainment.  Production was handled by several record producers, including Alonzo "Justice" Williams, Ariel Caban, DJ Ace, Grand Daddy I.U., Mad Rome, Marc Live, Mayor, and LaVaba Mallison as executive producer. It also features guest appearances from Smoothe da Hustler, DV Alias Kryst, Fedie Demarco, Marc Live, Trigga tha Gambler, Corte, and Coco. Before its release, shopping for a deal, several record companies wanted to censor the album cover, depicting Ice-T and his wife Nicole "Coco" Austin naked in bed.

Track listing

Personnel
 Tracy Lauren Marrow – main artist, model
 Kenneth Scranton – featured artist (tracks: 4, 9, 12)
 Damon Smith – featured artist (tracks: 5, 11, 14)
 Marc Giveand – featured artist & producer (tracks: 6, 8, 11)
 Feddi De Marco – featured artist (tracks: 2, 17, 18)
 Tawan Smith – featured artist (track 11)
 Nicole Natalie Marrow Austin – featured artist (track 7), model
 Corte – featured artist (track 5)
 Alonzo "Justice" Williams – producer (tracks: 3, 4, 12, 13, 15)
 Romy Geroso Jr. – producer (tracks: 2, 10, 14)
 Ariel "The Cartel" Caban – producer (tracks: 7, 8)
 Richard Ascencio – producer (tracks: 9, 16)
 Grand Daddy I.U. – producer (track 1)
 The Mayor from Presidential Beats – producer (track 5)
 LaVaba Mallison – executive producer
 Hernan Santiago – engineering
 Taurez – engineering
 Tony Dawsey – mastering
 Steve Vaccariello – photography
 Jorge Hinojosa – management
 Mike Regen – marketing

References

External links

2006 albums
Ice-T albums